The 2017 European Cadet Judo Championships is an edition of the European Cadet Judo Championships, organised by the International Judo Federation. It was held in Kaunas, Lithuania from 30 June to 2 July 2017. The final day of competition featured team events, with team Georgia winning the men's event and team Germany the women's.

Medal summary

Medal table

Men's events

Women's events

Source Results

References

External links
 

 U18
European Cadet Judo Championships
European Championships, U18
Judo
Judo
Judo, European Championships U18
Judo, European Championships U18